Casey Cardinia Libraries is one of Victoria's largest public library services. It serves more than 420,000 people in the Casey Cardinia Region.

Libraries are located at Cranbourne, Doveton, Emerald, Endeavour Hills, Hampton Park, Narre Warren and Pakenham, with the Cardinia Mobile Library providing weekly service to Beaconsfield, Bunyip, Cockatoo, Garfield, Gembrook, Koo Wee Rup, Lang Lang, Maryknoll, Nar Nar Goon, Tynong and Upper Beaconsfield.

Casey Cardinia Libraries is a library corporation constituted under the Local Government Act 1989 and funded by the City of Casey, Cardinia Shire Council and the Victorian State Government

History
Casey Cardinia Library Corporation (CCL), was formed on 1 October 1996. It was previously part of the Dandenong Valley Regional Library Service (DVRLS) which was disbanded following Council amalgamations in 1995. The City of Greater Dandenong took over operations of the Dandenong and Springvale branches and CCL continued to operate the remaining branches from its headquarters in Cranbourne. In 2017, the library administration and technical services was decentralised. Some members of the newly named Regional Support team predominantly work out of either Cranbourne or Doveton Library. Other Regional Support staff work remotely or on site at different branch locations or in the offices of either Council.

Branches

Bunjil Place Library

Bunjil Place Library first opened as Narre Warren Library in Malcolm Court, Narre Warren in 1978. In 1992, it moved into premises at Fountain Gate Shopping Centre adjacent to the City of Berwick offices. At 1350 square metres, it was the largest of the CCL libraries.  In October 2017, the library relocated to 2 Patrick Northeast Drive as part of the Bunjil Place complex, a "mix of facilities, including an outdoor community plaza, theatre, multipurpose studio, function centre, library gallery and City of Casey Customer Service Centre, all in one place."

Cranbourne Library

Cranbourne Shire Library began providing library services from the former Engineer's offices in Sladen street in 1978. The formation of CCL in 1996 led to the establishment of 'Headquarters' and the relocation of Cranbourne branch to part of the former Ford Factory in Berwick Cranbourne Road, now known as the Casey Indoor Leisure Complex, which includes Casey Stadium. The library was renovated and extended in 2002. In 2017, the Local History Archive and Narre Warren & District Family History Group were relocated to the facilities adjacent to the library.

Doveton Library

After a couple of earlier incarnations, the Shire of Berwick rented the Presbyterian Church Hall as library premises in 1969. It moved to 148 Kidd Road where it became the 2nd branch (after Springvale) of the DVRLS in 1973. The council then purchased a Service station in Autumn Place next to the shopping centre and, after extensive renovations, opened the current Doveton library there in 1983. The library was renovated and extended in 2008.

Emerald Library

The $2.2 million Emerald Library opened in July 2006. In 2019, the Emerald Hills Hub opened next door, "an integrated community facility".  As part of this development, Emerald Library was repainted and the entry adjusted to match the neighbouring facility.

Endeavour Hills Library

Rapid population growth in Endeavour Hills in the early 1980s resulted in the construction of a permanent library to replace the mobile service. The building was officially opened in Raymond McMahon Boulevard on 31 May 1987. IT is co-located with the Endeavour Hills Leisure Centre, adjacent to the Endeavour Hills Shopping Centre. A 2007 renovation and extension has significantly increased the size of the library. In 2019, a new 1200m2 town square was completed between the library and the leisure centre.  The Town Square provides space for civic celebrations with seating space and shade materials, and also incorporates a skate park.

Hampton Park Library

Hampton Park Library opened in January 2004, adjacent to Arthur Wren Hall. An application to extend the Library through a Living Libraries Grant resulted in a building extension, adding an additional 30% in public space. The official opening of the Hampton Park library extension (of 270 m2) and newly co-located Youth Centre took place on 30/10/10.

Pakenham Library

Pakenham Library began providing library services in Pakenham from portable buildings in 1979. The building was located at the corner of John Street and Drake street (on the site now occupied by the Fruit and Vegetable market). The first permanent  building (also in John street, opposite the Fire Station) opened in 1991 and closed in 2009. A new $mil 7.5 complex housing  a library, hall and U3A was officially opened at the corner of John and Henry streets on Friday 15 July 2011.

Cardinia Mobile Library
A Bookmobile service was introduced to the Pakenham area in 1973. The current vehicle has been in service since 1999. It underwent a refurbishment in April 2010 that included painting, recarpeting, a new desk and air conditioning/heating units as well as relocation of the disability hoist to the rear of the vehicle. The vehicle carries over 13000 items and makes weekly visits to eleven towns in Cardinia.  A new mobile library trailer arrived in December 2019, funded by the Victorian State Government and Cardinia Shire.

See also
 Libraries in Melbourne

References

Public libraries in Australia
Libraries in Victoria (Australia)
Libraries established in 1996
1996 establishments in Australia